André Gaspar Mendes de Carvalho is an Angolan politician for CASA-CE and a member of the National Assembly of Angola.

References

Living people
Members of the National Assembly (Angola)
Year of birth missing (living people)
Angolan politicians